Strike Vector is a first-person shooter video game developed by the French independent studio Ragequit Corporation.

The game is built on the Unreal Development Kit Engine. It was released for Microsoft Windows on January 28, 2014 on Steam. A console port Strike Vector EX was released for PlayStation 4 and Xbox One in August 2016 and also released for Windows on Steam in July 2017.

The game was removed from sale on Steam with the closure of Ragequit Corporation in 2020.

Gameplay
Strike Vector is an arena shooter game like Quake 3. The players control the Vector, a highly customizable and manoeuvrable jet fighter. Your can instantly switch between 2 movement modes: Jet Mode (high-speed, for intercepting opponents and evading incoming projectiles) and Stationary Mode (allows strafing in all directions with increased precision).

The game features a third-person view and first-person cockpit view. Strike Vector is centered on multiplayer but also offers a solo game mode called "Challenge mode".

Reception

References

External links 
 

2014 video games
Linux games
MacOS games
PlayStation 4 games
Space combat simulators
Space opera video games
Video games about mecha
Video games developed in France
Windows games
Xbox One games